Dmitry Pogorely (born 4 October 1977, Nizhnevartovsk, Khanty-Mansi Autonomous Okrug) is a Russian political figure and a deputy of the 8th State Duma. 

In 2003, Pogorely was granted a Candidate of Sciences in Juridical  Sciences degree. From 2003 to 2008, he worked as a Senior Assistant Prosecutor in the Prosecutor's Office of the Yamalo-Nenets Autonomous Okrug. In 2010-2021, Pogorely  served as the director of the State and Legal Department of the Yamalo-Nenets Autonomous Okrug. Since September 2021, he has served as deputy of the 8th State Duma.

References

1977 births
Living people
United Russia politicians
21st-century Russian politicians
Eighth convocation members of the State Duma (Russian Federation)
People from Nizhnevartovsk